This is a List of Serbian inventors and discoverers, working locally or overseas. The list comprises people from Serbia and ethnic Serb people.

Science, Mathematics and Technology 
Mihailo Petrović:
 
Voja Antonić:
 
Galaksija home computer (1983).

Mihajlo Pupin:

Loading coil

Mihajlo Pupin Institute:

HRS-100
CER Computers
ATLAS-TIM AT 32

Nikola Tesla:

Induction motor
Radio-controlled model
Wireless power transfer
Plasma globe
Capacitor discharge ignition
Magnifying transmitter
Teleforce
Telegeodynamics
Teleoperation
Tesla coil
Tesla turbine
Tesla's oscillator
Tesla valve
Wardenclyffe tower
World Wireless System
Violet ray
Vacuum variable capacitor
Pioneer in alternating current research

Slobodan Ćuk:

Ćuk converter

Iván Gutman:

Graph energy 
Matching polynomial

Jovan Karamata:

Karamata's inequality
Slowly varying function
Improved the Hardy–Littlewood tauberian theorem

Đuro Kurepa:

Kurepa tree

Bogdan Maglich:

Migma

Milutin Milanković:

Milankovitch cycles
Revised Julian calendar (second most accurate calendar ever written) 
Calculated temperatures of the upper  layers of the earths atmosphere as well as  temperature conditions of planets on the inner solar system as well as depth of the atmosphere of the outer planets.

Tihomir Novakov:

Father of black carbon
Aethalometer

Vlatko Vedral:

Quantum discord

Vladimir Vukićević:

webGL
APNG

Jovan Cvijić:

Study of Karst
Father of karst geomorphology

Petar Gburčik:

Author of first mathematical models of the numerical weather prediction

Pavle Savić:

Research on interactions of neutrons in chemical physics of heavy elements. which turned out to be an important step in the discovery of nuclear fission.

Mechanics 
Miomir Vukobratović:

Powered exoskeleton
Humanoid robot  "The beginning of the development of humanoid robotics coincided with the beginning of the development of the world's first active exoskeletons at the Mihailo Pupin Institute in 1969, under the guidance of Prof. Vukobratovic. Legged locomotion systems were developed first. Also, the first theory of these systems was developed in the same institute, in the frame of active exoskeletons. Hence, it can be said that active exoskeletons were the predecessors of the modern high-performance humanoid robots. The present-day active exoskeletons are developed as the systems for enhancing capabilities of the natural human skeletal system. The most successful version of an active exoskeleton for rehabilitation of paraplegics and similar disabled persons, pneumatically powered and electronically programmed was realized and tested at Belgrade Orthopedic Clinic in 1972."
Robot locomotion
Zero moment point "The zero moment point is a very important concept in the motion planning for biped robots. Since they have only two points of contact with the floor and they are supposed to walk, "run" or "jump" (in the motion context), their motion has to be planned concerning the dynamical stability of their whole body. This is not an easy task, especially because the upper body of the robot (torso) has larger mass and inertia than the legs which are supposed to support and move the robot. This can be compared to the problem of balancing an inverted pendulum."

Rajko Tomović:

Prostethic five-fingered hand

Medicine and Pharmacology 
Miodrag Radulovacki:
 
Pioneering pharmalogical studies for the treatment of sleep apnea.

Linguistics 
Vuk Karadžić:

Serbian Cyrillic alphabet

Culture, Arts & Architecture 
First Serbian uprising:

Balkan brass
A distinctive style of music originating in the Balkan region as a fusion between military music and folk music. In recent years, it has become popular in a techno-synth fusion throughout Europe, and in pop music in the Anglo sphere and throughout the world.  American bands such as Fifth Harmony and Gogol Bordello have brought the style to a new audience.

Rambo Amadeus:

Turbo-folk

Đurađ Branković:

Serbian epic poetry

Nemanjić dynasty:

Raška architectural school
Serbo-Byzantine architecture

Lazar Hrebeljanović:

Morava architectural school

Constantine the Great

Miscellaneous:

Serbo-Byzantine Revival architecture
Kolo, a dance
Origin of vampire folklore and mythology with the Petar Blagojević and Arnold Paole case

Fashion 
Nikola Bizumić:

Hair clipper
Buzz cut

 "Manual hair clippers were invented by the Serbian inventor named Nikola Bizumić. Before the advent of the electrically powered Clippers, these clippers were widely used by barbers to chop hair close and fast. The clipper accumulates hair in locks to rapidly depilate your head. This type of haircut is normal in the military in addition to among boys in schools where strict grooming conventions will be in effect."

Military 
Miodrag Tomić:

Dogfight
Fighter aircraft 
The first aerial dogfight occurred during the Battle of Cer (15–24 August 1914), when Serbian aviator Miodrag Tomić encountered an Austro-Hungarian plane while performing a reconnaissance mission over Austro-Hungarian positions. The Austro-Hungarian pilot initially waved, and Tomić reciprocated. The Austro-Hungarian pilot then fired at Tomić with his revolver.  Tomić produced a pistol of his own and fired back. Tomić managed to escape, and within several weeks, all Serbian and Austro-Hungarian planes were fitted with machine-guns.

See also 
List of Serbian inventions and discoveries

References

External links

 
Lists of inventors
 
History of science and technology by country
Lists of inventions or discoveries
Inventors and discoverers
Inventors and discoverers